is a one-shot Japanese manga written and illustrated by Yuko Kuwabara. It is licensed in North America by Digital Manga Publishing, which released the manga through its imprint, Juné, on July 8, 2008.

Reception
Mania Entertainment's Julie Rosato found the manga neither too angsty or too cloying, describing it as predictable enough, but pleasant.  Leroy Douresseaux, writing for Comic Book Bin, liked that the characters were uncertain about their relationship, and were concerned with coming out of the closet, and appreciated that the relationships presented were shown at varying levels of intimacy. Holly Ellingwood, writing for Active Anime enjoyed the artwork.

References

External links

Comedy anime and manga
2007 manga
Yaoi anime and manga
Digital Manga Publishing titles